The 2022–23 National League season, known as the Vanarama National League for sponsorship reasons, is the eighth season under English football's new title of the National League, the twentieth season consisting of three divisions, and the forty-fourth season overall.

This season sees the expansion of North and South divisions to 24 teams apiece, a planned increase which was originally scheduled in 2019 to occur ahead of the 2021–22 season. However, after the curtailment and voidance of the 2020–21 season for both North and South, promotion and relegation were postponed. For those reasons, the implementation of expansion plans was delayed until 2022–23.

National League

Team changes 

To National League
Promoted from 2021–22 National League North
 Gateshead
 York City

Promoted from 2021–22 National League South
 Maidstone United
 Dorking Wanderers

Relegated from 2021–22 League Two
 Scunthorpe United
 Oldham Athletic

From National League
Promoted to 2022–23 League Two
 Stockport County
 Grimsby Town

Relegated to 2022–23 National League North
 King's Lynn Town

Relegated to 2022–23 National League South
 Dover Athletic
 Weymouth

Oldham Athletic is the first former Premier League club to be relegated to the National League, and their matches against Notts County will be the third fixture to be played in all five top tiers of English football.

Stadia and locations

Personnel and sponsoring

Managerial changes

National League table

Results table

Top scorers

Updated to match(es) played on 18 March 2023.

Hat-tricks

Monthly awards
Each month the Vanarama National League announces their official Player of the Month and Manager of the Month.

National League North

The National League North consists of 24 teams for the first time.

Team changes

To National League North
Relegated from 2021–22 National League
 King's Lynn Town
Promoted from 2021–22 Northern Premier League
 Buxton
 Scarborough Athletic
Promoted from 2021–22 Southern Football League
 Banbury United
 Peterborough Sports

From National League North
Promoted to 2022–23 National League
 Gateshead
 York City

Relegated to 2022–23 Northern Premier League
 Guiseley

Stadia and locations

Managerial changes

National League North table

Results table

Top scorers

Hat-tricks

Monthly awards
Each month the Vanarama National League announces their official Player of the Month and Manager of the Month.

National League South

The National League South also consists of 24 teams for the first time.

Team changes

To National League South
Relegated from 2021–22 National League
 Dover Athletic
 Weymouth
Promoted from 2021–22 Isthmian League
 Worthing
 Cheshunt
Promoted from 2021–22 Southern Football League
 Taunton Town
 Farnborough

From National League South
Promoted to 2022–23 National League
 Maidstone United
 Dorking Wanderers

Relegated to 2022–23 Isthmian League
 Billericay Town

Current league stadia locations 2022–23

Managerial changes

National League South table

Results table

Top scorers

Hat-tricks

Monthly awards
Each month the Vanarama National League announces their official Player of the Month and Manager of the Month.

References 

2022–23 National League
5
Eng
Eng